Luca Guidetti (born 6 May 1986) is an Italian footballer who plays for  club Alessandria.

Club career
On 8 January 2019, he signed a 1.5-year contract with FeralpiSalò.

On 11 January 2023, Guidetti moved to Alessandria.

Honours

Club 
 Monza
Serie D: 2016-17
Scudetto Dilettanti: 2016-17

References

1986 births
Living people
Footballers from Milan
Italian footballers
Association football midfielders
Serie C players
Serie D players
Como 1907 players
A.C. Renate players
U.S. Folgore Caratese A.S.D. players
S.C. Caronnese S.S.D. players
A.C. Monza players
FeralpiSalò players
F.C. Sangiuliano City players
U.S. Alessandria Calcio 1912 players